The Nomenclature of Territorial Units for Statistics (NUTS) is a geocode standard for referencing the subdivisions of Switzerland for statistical purposes. As a member of EFTA Switzerland is included in the NUTS standard, although the standard is developed and regulated by the European Union, an organization that Switzerland does not belong to. The NUTS standard is instrumental in delivering the European Union's Structural Funds. The NUTS code for Switzerland is CH and a hierarchy of three levels is established by Eurostat. Below these is a further levels of geographic organisation - the local administrative unit (LAU). In Switzerland, the LAUs are districts (LAU-1) and municipalities (LAU-2).

Overall 
The three NUTS levels are:

NUTS codes 

The NUTS codes are as follows:

Local Administrative Units 
Below the NUTS levels, there are two Local Administrative Units (LAU) levels

LAU-1: Districts

LAU-2: Municipalities

Notes and references

See also
 Subdivisions of Switzerland
 ISO 3166-2 codes of Switzerland
 FIPS region codes of Switzerland
 Comparison of ISO, FIPS, and NUTS codes of the cantons of Switzerland
 List of regions of Switzerland by Human Development Index

External links
 Hierarchical list of the Nomenclature of territorial units for statistics - NUTS and the Statistical regions of Europe
 Overview map of EFTA countries - Statistical regions at level 1
 SCHWEIZ/SUISSE/SVIZZERA - Statistical regions at level 2
 SCHWEIZ/SUISSE/SVIZZERA - Statistical regions at level 3
 Correspondence between the regional levels and the national administrative units
 Cantons of Switzerland, Statoids.com

Switzerland
Subdivisions of Switzerland
Regions of Switzerland